was a Japanese politician who was a member of the Japanese Diet from 1946–1952. In 1950, she became the first woman in Japanese political history to have a baby while in office.

Biography 
Sonoda was born in Tokyo on 23 January 1919.

Tenkoko Sonoda was the widow of Minister for Foreign Affairs Sunao Sonoda. She was the step-mother to Hiroyuki Sonoda. She was a socialist at first, and belonged to the Japan Socialist Party (the Social Democratic Party Japan; SDPJ) and the Workers and Farmers Party (Maoism) in the Diet, but changed her opinion by herself to be conservative after her marriage to Sunao.

She was a member of the representative committee of the openly revisionist lobby Nippon Kaigi, to which her son-in-law Hiroyuki is also affiliated.

Sonoda died on 29 January 2015 at the age of 96.

References

Sources 
http://findarticles.com/p/articles/mi_m0XPQ/is_2000_April_17/ai_61968766

1919 births
2015 deaths
People from Tokyo
Spouses of Japanese politicians
Female members of the House of Representatives (Japan)
Members of Nippon Kaigi
Members of the House of Representatives (Japan)
Members of the House of Representatives (Empire of Japan)
Social Democratic Party (Japan) politicians
20th-century Japanese women politicians
Tenkoko